Dylan Buckley (born 16 March 1993) is a former professional Australian rules footballer who played for the Greater Western Sydney Giants and the Carlton Football Club in the Australian Football League (AFL). He is the creator, producer and host of two of Australia's most popular sports-themed podcasts: Dyl & Friends and List Cloggers, ranked 2nd and 5th, respectively, in the sports category, according to Chartable as of June 2022.

Junior career
Buckley played school football for Ivanhoe Grammar School and also played TAC Cup football with the Northern Knights. He was a member of the 2009 AIS-AFL Academy, and he represented Vic Metro in the 2010 AFL Under 18 Championships. He was described by Carlton recruiting manager Wayne Hughes as "a quick midfielder with excellent disposal skills".

AFL career
Buckley is the only son of Jim Buckley, who was a midfielder for Carlton in the 1970s and 1980s. Jim played 164 games for Carlton and was a member of the 1979, 1981 and 1982 premiership teams. Because of his father's career, Buckley was eligible to be drafted by Carlton under the Father–Son Rule. The club had informally committed to recruiting Buckley in early 2010, more than eighteen months before he was eligible to be drafted. Buckley was formally recruited under the Father–Son Rule in October 2011, with Carlton able to use its last selection in the 2011 National Draft (a third-round selection, No. 62) to recruit him. He was given guernsey number 7. Buckley made his debut in Round 3 of the 2013 season, starting the game as a substitute. Buckley kicked a goal with his first kick in AFL football and finished the game with 5 disposals, but that was his only game of 2013.

In 2014, Buckley started the season with an outstanding game against the Richmond Tigers in Round 2, gathering 18 disposals and 6 tackles, and was nominated for the AFL Rising Star award; however, he only played a further 7 games for the season.

2015 was a breakout year for Buckley, cementing his spot in Carlton's best 22, playing 18 games and kicking 5 goals for the season. His highlight of the season included a career-high 23 disposals against Fremantle in Round 16.

2016 saw Buckley struggle with inconsistent form and injury, only managing 11 games for the year, but he had a career-high three goals against the Demons in round 22.

At the conclusion of the 2017 season, in which Buckley only managed to play a single game, he was delisted by Carlton. However, he was later selected by the Greater Western Sydney Giants via the 2017 rookie draft. He went on to play a further two games for the Giants in 2018, including a game where he kicked two goals against Essendon in Round 10, which was also his last game in the AFL. He was delisted by Greater Western Sydney Giants at the conclusion of the 2019 season.

Personal life 

In 2021, Buckley completed the Melbourne Marathon in 3:50:35.

Buckley is an avid golfer and founded More Greens Golf.

Podcasting 
While at Carlton, Buckley dabbled in the media department, hosting a quirky short-form interview series called Discussions with Dylan. In 2018, following his move to the Giants, Buckley entered the world of podcasting, creating a new interview series called Dyl and Friends. Buckley's first guest was GWS teammate Josh Kelly, and he has since hosted over 180 episodes, including guests Ben Crowe, Hugh van Cuylenberg, Zac Seidler and Richard Harris OAM.

In 2020, Buckley and former Carlton teammate Daniel Gorringe started the List Cloggers podcast. As of March 9, 2023, 91 episodes have been released.

In 2021, Buckley established Producey, an independent content and amplification agency in Melbourne.

References

External links

Living people
1993 births
Carlton Football Club players
Greater Western Sydney Giants players
Northern Knights players
Preston Football Club (VFA) players
Australian rules footballers from Ballarat
People educated at Ivanhoe Grammar School